The 1996 Indian general election in Jammu and Kashmir to the 11th Lok Sabha were held for 6 seats. Bharatiya Janata Party won 1 seat, Indian National Congress won 4 seats and Janta Dal won 1 seat.

Constituency Details

Results

Party-wise Results

List of Elected MPs

See also 

 Results of the 2004 Indian general election by state
 Elections in Jammu and Kashmir

References 

1996
1996
Jammu